The Hoose-Gow is a 1929 short film starring Laurel and Hardy, directed by James Parrott and produced by Hal Roach.

Synopsis
Stan and Ollie arrive as new inmates at a prison after apparently taking part in a hold-up raid, a raid they tell a prison officer they were only watching.

After signalling to friends across the prison wall a rope ladder appears while they speak to the prison guard. Their accomplices run off when the guard climbs the ladder, but when the guard opens the outer door he accidentally closes it with them outside and they run off. Reappearing with a shotgun and Laurel and Hardy return with the seats of their trousers shot out.

Doing outside works, the fellow prisoners tell them the guard's dinner table is theirs and they begin to eat.

Sent to chop a tree down, it eventually falls on the guard's tent just as the governor drives up.

They are sent to dig ditches with other convicts on work detail. After Stan's pick-axe gets caught in Ollie's jacket and rips it, Ollie throws the pick away and it accidentally pierces the radiator of the governor's car. They stem the flow of water by filling the radiator with dry rice on the advice of another convict. However, the rice boils up and spews out as rice pudding after the engine is started. This starts a rice-throwing melee with the visiting governor and his party.

Opening title
'Neither Mr. Laurel nor Mr. Hardy had any thoughts of doing wrong. As a matter of fact, they had no thoughts of any kind.'

Cast

References

External links
 
 
 
 

1929 films
1929 comedy films
American black-and-white films
American prison comedy films
Films directed by James Parrott
Laurel and Hardy (film series)
1929 short films
American comedy short films
1920s English-language films
1920s American films